Sagit Zluf Namir (born 1978) is an Israeli photographer and educator

Biography 
Namir was born in 1978 in Kfar Saba. She is known for her non-standard representation of still life objects. She takes real life objects from their context and re-creates them as vulnerable personal images. Her photography is minimalistic with a delicate game of nuances. Namir graduated from WIZO Haifa Academy of Design and Education with a BFA. She teaches photography classes in WIZO Haifa Academy of Design and Education, Minshar School of Arts and Gavra School of Photography in Tel Aviv. Namir was teaching photography workshops in Herzliya Museum of Contemporary Art from 2007 to 2009. She has served as one of the judges of the Local Testimony exhibition and award from 2016. Zluf Namir's artistic style is highly academical and not commercial.

Namir's works are part of the public collection of Haifa Museum of Art.

Exhibitions

Solo 
2005 "Every angel is terrible". Artists House. Jerusalem
2006. "Photographs from the Nidbach series". Artists House. Jerusalem.
2008. "Chinco". D&A Gallery. Tel Aviv.
2009 "Clean&Cold/Photography". "Kayma" Gallery. Jaffa
2011 "Fraction". "Indie" Photography Gallery. Tel Aviv
2012 "In Vitro". "Indie" Photography Gallery. Tel Aviv
2013 "In Vitro". "Indie" Photography Gallery. Tel Aviv
2015 "Natural Choice". WIZO Haifa Academy of Design and Education Main Gallery.
2019 "Hajibada". Minshar Gallery of Art. Curated by Irena Gordon.

Group 
2008. "Dead End". Rosenfeld Gallery. Tel Aviv
2010. "To dream reality". Pyramida Center for Contemporary Art. Curated by Shirley Meshulam.
2015. "Vulnerability". ArtSpace Gallery. Tel Aviv.
2016. "Vacuum Photographers". Tel Aviv International Photography Festival.
2016. "White on white". Haifa Museum of Art.
2017. "Fresh Paint" contemporary art fair. The Steinhardt Museum of Natural History. Tel Aviv
2017 "If Helios had decided to tilt the sun". "The photography lab" gallery, Curated by Assaf Gam Hacohen. Tel Aviv
2018 "Big Eyes". Gallery on the Cliff. Netanya.

Curatorship 
2011. "Curriculum Vitae" by Mark Yashaev. Artists House. Jerusalem
2012. "Death of an Agent" by Assaf Gam HaCohen. Indie Gallery. Tel Aviv
2015. "The Edge" Group Exhibition. Hangar 2 Gallery, Jaffa Port.
2016. "Lucid" Group Exhibition. Hangar 2 Gallery, Jaffa Port.
2017. "On the verge" Group Exhibition. Hangar 2 Gallery. Jaffa Port.
2017. "Frozen Moments" by Renana Ben-Ari. Jaffa Museum.
2019 "Standart Deviation". Group Exhibition. Photo:Israel 2019, Tel Aviv.
2019-2020 "Infected Bodies". Group Exhibition. Haifa Museum of Art.
2020 "Membrane". Debbie Morag, Solo Exhibition. Photo is:rael 2020
2020 "The Swimmer". Shunit Falko Zaritzky. Photo Is:rael 2020. Tel Aviv

Awards 
2003 Rotary Israel scholarship.
2004-2006 grant of AICF, American-Israel cultural foundation.
2016 Bronze prize in Fine Art / Still Life category. Tokyo International Foto Awards.
2019 commendation from the Association for Women's Art and Gender Research in Israel.

References

External links

1978 births
Living people
21st-century Israeli women artists
21st-century women photographers
Israeli photographers
Israeli women photographers
Israeli educators
Israeli art curators